Urile is a genus of birds in the family Phalacrocoracidae, commonly known as North Pacific cormorants. It contains 3 extant and 1 recently extinct species, all of which are or were found in the North Pacific Ocean.

Members of this genus were formerly classified within the genus Phalacrocorax. Based on the results of a molecular phylogenetic study published in 2014, the genus Phalacrocorax was split and these species were moved to the resurrected genus Urile that had been introduced in 1856 by the French naturalist Charles Lucien Bonaparte with the red-faced cormorant as the type species.   Urile is thought to have split from Phalacrocorax 8.9 - 10.3 million years ago. The genus contains four species, of which one is now extinct.

List of species

References 

Urile
Bird genera
Taxa named by Charles Lucien Bonaparte